Kielcza  is a village in the administrative district of Gmina Zawadzkie, within Strzelce County, Opole Voivodeship, Upper Silesia in south-western Poland.

The village has a population of 2,000.

Main sights
Three objects in Kielcza are considered monuments by National Heritage Board of Poland:
 Saint Bartholomew Church dating back to 1799
 Mass grave of Silesian Uprisings Polish separatist fighters
 Wooden house dating back to 1831

References
Notes

Villages in Strzelce County